Craig Ross (born 5 October 1970) is a former professional darts player from New Zealand, Who currently competes in the Professional Darts Corporation events. His the nickname The Rock.

Darts career
He qualified for the 2019 PDC World Darts Championship, replacing Tahuna Irwin, who had beaten him in the DPNZ Qualifier, but was unable to travel to the UK, owing to visa problems. Ross played Toni Alcinas of Spain in the first round, but only won one leg, and was easily defeated 3–0.

World Championship Results

PDC
 2019: First round: (lost to Toni Alcinas 0–3) (sets)

References

External links

1970 births
Living people
New Zealand darts players
Professional Darts Corporation associate players